Slingshot Professionals is an album by American blues singer and guitarist Kelly Joe Phelps, released in 2003.

History
Slingshot Professionals was Phelps' first album with producer Lee Townsend. Phelps is joined by guitarist Bill Frisell and bassist Keith Lowe on two tracks: "Not So Far to Go" and "Cardboard Box of Batteries," and the rest of the album features bassist Andrew Downing, as well as fiddler Jesse Zubot and guitarist Steve Dawson. Petra Haden (daughter of jazz musician Charlie Haden) whose album Townsend was producing at the time, harmonizes on one song.

Reception

Music critic Mark Allan wrote in his Allmusic review the album was "well worth a listen" The UK magazine  Uncut wrote "The transformation from revivalist bluesman to contemporary singer-songwriter, which began on 1999's Shine Eyed Mister Zen, continues apace on his fifth album. His songs are now mini stories, sans verse-chorus-bridge restraints, populated by seekers of truth and peddlers of dreams."

Track listing
All songs written by Kelly Joe Phelps.
"Jericho" – 6:29
"Window Grin" – 3:50
"Slingshot Professionals" – 5:07
"Not So Far to Go" – 5:16
"It's James Now" – 4:22
"Waiting for Marty" – 5:05
"Knock Louder" – 4:24
"Cardboard Box of Batteries" – 5:18
"Circle Wars" – 7:05
"Rusting Gate" – 4:51

Personnel
Kelly Joe Phelps – vocals, guitar, harmonica
Andrew Downing – acoustic bass
Steve Dawson – Weissenborn lap steel guitar
Bill Frisell – electric guitar
Chris Gestrin – organ, piano, accordion
Scott Amendola – drums, percussion, talking drum
Petra Haden – background vocals
Keith Lowe – acoustic bass
Jesse Zubot – mandolin, violin
Production notes:
Produced by Lee Townsend.
Engineered by Tucker Martine and Shawn Pierce.
Edited and mixed by Shawn Pierce
Assistant engineers - Sheldon Zaharko and Greg Kolchinsky
Mastered by Greg Calbi
Design by Chris Pew

References

External links
Discography at Kelly Joe Phelps official web site.

2003 albums
Kelly Joe Phelps albums
Rykodisc albums